Balsa is a genus of moths of the family Noctuidae.

Species
 Balsa labecula (Grote, 1880)
 Balsa malana (Fitch, 1856)
 Balsa tristigella (Walker, 1866)

References
 Balsa at Markku Savela's Lepidoptera and Some Other Life Forms
 Natural History Museum Lepidoptera genus database

Hadeninae